Great Egg Harbor Inlet is an inlet connecting Great Egg Harbor Bay with the Atlantic Ocean in New Jersey, forming a part of the boundary between Atlantic and Cape May Counties.

Geography
Great Egg Harbor Inlet separates Absecon Island from Pecks Beach, and connects Great Egg Harbor Bay with the Atlantic Ocean.

Great Egg Harbor Inlet was described in 1878, viz.,

See also 
Absecon Island
Pecks Beach

References 

Inlets of New Jersey
Bodies of water of Atlantic County, New Jersey
Bodies of water of Cape May County, New Jersey